Vice-Admiral Horatio Nelson, 1st Viscount Nelson, 1st Duke of Bronte  (29 September 1758 – 21 October 1805) was a British flag officer in the Royal Navy. His inspirational leadership, grasp of strategy, and unconventional tactics brought about a number of decisive British naval victories during the French Revolutionary and Napoleonic Wars. He is widely regarded as one of the greatest naval commanders in history.

Nelson was born into a moderately prosperous Norfolk family and joined the navy through the influence of his uncle, Maurice Suckling, a high-ranking naval officer. Nelson rose rapidly through the ranks and served with leading naval commanders of the period before obtaining his own command at the age of 20, in 1778. He developed a reputation for personal valour and a firm grasp of tactics, but suffered periods of illness and unemployment after the end of the American War of Independence. The outbreak of the French Revolutionary Wars allowed Nelson to return to service, where he was particularly active in the Mediterranean. He fought in several minor engagements off Toulon and was important in the capture of Corsica, where he was wounded and partially lost sight in one eye, and subsequent diplomatic duties with the Italian states. Shortly after that battle, Nelson took part in the Battle of Santa Cruz de Tenerife, where the attack failed and he lost his right arm, forcing him to return to England to recuperate. The following year he won a decisive victory over the French at the Battle of the Nile and remained in the Mediterranean to support the Kingdom of Naples against a French invasion.

In 1801, Nelson was dispatched to the Baltic Sea and defeated neutral Denmark at the Battle of Copenhagen. He commanded the blockade of the French and Spanish fleets at Toulon and, after their escape, chased them to the West Indies and back but failed to bring them to battle. After a brief return to England, he took over the Cádiz blockade, in 1805. On 21 October 1805, the Franco-Spanish fleet came out of port, and Nelson's fleet engaged them at the Battle of Trafalgar. The battle became one of Britain's greatest naval victories, but Nelson, aboard , was fatally wounded by a French sharpshooter. His body was brought back to England, where he was accorded a state funeral.

Nelson's death at Trafalgar secured his position as one of Britain's most heroic figures. His signal just prior to the commencement of the battle, "England expects that every man will do his duty", is regularly quoted and paraphrased.  Numerous monuments, including Nelson's Column in Trafalgar Square, London, and the Nelson Monument in Edinburgh, have been created in his memory.

Early life

Horatio Nelson was born on 29 September 1758, at a rectory in Burnham Thorpe, Norfolk, England; the sixth of eleven children of the Reverend Edmund Nelson and his wife Catherine Suckling. He was named "Horatio" after his godfather Horatio Walpole, 1st Earl of Orford (1723–1809), the first cousin of his maternal great-grandmother Anne Turner (1691–1768). Horatio Walpole was a nephew of Robert Walpole, 1st Earl of Orford, the de facto first prime minister of Great Britain. Nelson retained a strong Christian faith throughout his life.

Nelson's uncle Maurice Suckling was a high-ranking naval officer, and is believed to have had a major impact on Nelson's life. Nelson's peculiarly strong hatred for the French probably also came from Maurice - describing them as 'gobblers' in conversation with him as a child.

Catherine Suckling lived in the village of Barsham, Suffolk, and married the Reverend Edmund Nelson at Beccles Church, Suffolk, in 1749. Nelson's aunt, Alice Nelson was the wife of Reverend Robert Rolfe, Rector of Hilborough, Norfolk, and grandmother of Sir Robert Monsey Rolfe. Rolfe twice served as Lord High Chancellor of Great Britain.

Nelson attended Paston Grammar School, North Walsham, until he was 12 years old, and also attended King Edward VI's Grammar School in Norwich. His naval career began on 1 January 1771, when he reported to the newly commissioned third-rate  as an ordinary seaman and coxswain under his maternal uncle, Captain Maurice Suckling, who commanded the vessel. Shortly after reporting aboard, Nelson was appointed a midshipman, and began officer training. Early in his service, Nelson discovered that he experienced seasickness, a chronic complaint that he experienced for the rest of his life.

East and West Indies, 1771–1780
HMS Raisonnable had been commissioned during a period of tension with Spain, but when this passed, Suckling was transferred to the Nore guardship  and Nelson was dispatched to serve aboard the West Indiaman Mary Ann of the merchant shipping firm of Hibbert, Purrier and Horton, in order to gain experience at sea. He sailed from Medway, Kent, on 25 July 1771, heading to Jamaica and Tobago, and returning to Plymouth on 7 July 1772. He twice crossed the Atlantic, before returning to serve under his uncle as the commander of Suckling's longboat, which carried men and dispatches, to and from shore. Nelson then learnt of a planned expedition, under the command of Constantine Phipps, intended to survey a passage in the Arctic by which it was hoped that India could be reached: the fabled North-East Passage.

At his nephew's request, Suckling arranged for Nelson to join the expedition as coxswain to Commander Lutwidge aboard the converted bomb vessel, . The expedition reached within ten degrees of the North Pole, but, unable to find a way through the dense ice floes, was forced to turn back. By 1800, Lutwidge had begun to circulate a story that, while the ship had been trapped in the ice, Nelson had spotted and pursued a polar bear, before being ordered to return to the ship. Later, in 1809, Lutwidge had it that Nelson, and a companion, gave chase to the bear and upon being questioned as to why, replied: "I wished, Sir, to get the skin for my father."

Nelson briefly returned to Triumph, after the expedition's return to Britain, in September 1773.

Nelson sailed for the East Indies on 19 November 1773, and arrived at the British outpost at Madras on 25 May 1774. Nelson and Seahorse spent the rest of the year cruising off the coast and escorting merchantmen. With the outbreak of the First Anglo-Maratha War, the British fleet operated in support of the East India Company and in early 1775, Seahorse was dispatched to carry a cargo of the company's money to Bombay. On 19 February, two of Hyder Ali's ketches attacked Seahorse, which drove them off after a brief exchange of fire. This was Nelson's first experience of battle.

He spent the rest of the year escorting convoys, during which he continued to develop his navigation and ship handling skills. In early 1776, Nelson contracted malaria and became seriously ill. He was discharged from Seahorse on 14 March and returned to England aboard . Nelson spent the six-month voyage recuperating and had almost recovered by the time he arrived in Britain, in September 1776. His patron, Suckling, had risen to the post of Comptroller of the Navy in 1775, and used his influence to help Nelson gain further promotion. Nelson was appointed acting lieutenant aboard , which was about to sail to Gibraltar.

Worcester, under the command of Captain Mark Robinson, sailed as a convoy escort on 3 December, and returned with another convoy in April 1777. Nelson then travelled to London to take his lieutenant's examination on 9 April; his examining board consisted of Captains John Campbell, Abraham North, and his uncle, Maurice Suckling. She sailed on 16 May, arrived on 19 July, and after reprovisioning, carried out several cruises in Caribbean waters. After the outbreak of the American War of Independence, Lowestoffe took several prizes, one of which was taken into Navy service as Little Lucy. Nelson asked for, and was given, command of her, and took her on two cruises of his own.

As well as giving him his first taste of command, it gave Nelson the opportunity to explore his fledgling interest in science. During his first cruise in command of Little Lucy, Nelson led an expeditionary party to the Caicos Islands, where he made detailed notes of the wildlife and in particular a bird – now believed to be the white-necked jacobin. Locker, impressed by Nelson's abilities, recommended him to the new commander-in-chief at Jamaica, Sir Peter Parker. Parker duly took Nelson onto his flagship, . The entry of the French into the war, in support of the Americans, meant further targets for Parker's fleet. It took many prizes towards the end of 1778, which brought Nelson an estimated £400 in prize money. Parker appointed him as Master and Commander of the brig  on 8 December.

Nelson and Badger spent most of 1779 cruising off of the Central American coast, ranging as far as the British settlements at British Honduras (now Belize), and Nicaragua, but without much success at interception of enemy prizes. On his return to Port Royal, he learnt that Parker had promoted him to post-captain on 11 June, and intended to give him another command. Nelson handed over the Badger to Cuthbert Collingwood, while he awaited the arrival of his new ship: the 28-gun frigate , newly captured from the French. While Nelson waited, news reached Parker that a French fleet under the command of Charles Hector, comte d'Estaing, was approaching Jamaica. Parker hastily organized his defences and placed Nelson in command of Fort Charles, which covered the approaches to Kingston. D'Estaing instead headed north, and the anticipated invasion never materialised.

Nelson took command of the Hinchinbrook on 1 September 1779. Hinchinbrook sailed from Port Royal on 5 October and, in company with other British ships, proceeded to capture a number of American prizes. On his return to Jamaica in December, Nelson began to be troubled by recurrent attacks of malaria. Nelson remained in the West Indies in order to take part in Major-General John Dalling's attempt to capture the Spanish colonies in Central America, including an assault on the Fortress of the Immaculate Conception on the San Juan River in Nicaragua.

In February 1780, Hinchinbrook sailed from Jamaica as an escort for Dalling's invasion force. After sailing up the mouth of the San Juan River, Nelson’s expeditionary force obtained the surrender of the Fortress of the Immaculate Conception and its 160 Spanish defenders after a two-week siege. Despite this initial success, the British forces never reached Lake Nicaragua and, decimated by yellow fever, were forced to return to Jamaica. The British destroyed the fortress when they evacuated in January 1781. The failed campaign cost the lives of more than 2,500 men, making it the costliest British disaster of the entire war. Despite this, Nelson was praised for his efforts.

Parker recalled Nelson and gave him command of the 44-gun frigate, . In 1780, Nelson fell seriously ill with what seemed to be dysentery and possibly yellow fever, in the jungles of Costa Rica, and was unable to take command. He was taken to Kingston, Jamaica, to be nursed by "doctoress" Cubah Cornwallis, a rumored mistress of fellow captain William Cornwallis; she ran a combination lodging-house and convalescence home for sailors. He was discharged in August and returned to Britain aboard , arriving in late November. Nelson gradually recovered over several months, and soon began agitating for a command. He was appointed to the frigate  on 15 August 1781.

Nelson's views on slavery 

While Nelson served in the West Indies, he came into contact with several prominent white colonists residing there, forming friendships with many of them. These relationships led Nelson to imbibe their proslavery views, particularly the view that slavery was necessary to the islands' economic prosperity. According to Grindal, Nelson later used his social influence to counter the emerging abolitionist movement in Britain. University of Southampton academic Christer Petley contextualises this view:

The debate over the future of slavery divided Britons. Wilberforce personified one type of British patriotism—arguing for an end to slave-trading on the basis that it was a blot on the reputation of a proud and Christian nation. Slaveholders offered their own patriotic arguments—maintaining that the trade was so instrumental to the imperial economy that Britain could ill-afford to stop it. Nelson had befriended several slaveholding colonists during his time in the Caribbean. Privately, he came to sympathise with their political outlook. It is clear that, by the time of his death at Trafalgar, he despised Wilberforce and stood in staunch opposition to the British abolitionist campaign.

Over the course of his life, Nelson came into contact numerous times with aspects of slavery and the people who were involved in that institution. These included both his relationships with Caribbean plantation owners and his marriage to Fanny, a slaveowner who was born into a family which belonged to the Antiguan plantocracy. One of his friends in the West Indies was Simon Taylor, one of the richest plantation owners in Jamaica who owned hundreds of slaves. In 1805, Taylor wrote to Nelson, requesting that he publicly intervene in favour of the pro-slavery side in Britain's debate over abolition. Nelson wrote a letter back to Taylor, writing that "while [he had] ... a tongue", he would "launch [his] voice against the damnable and cursed (sic) doctrine of Wilberforce and his hypocritical allies". In the same latter, Nelson also wrote that he had always "[endeavoured] to serve the Public weal, of which the West India Colonies form so prominent and interesting a part. I have ever been, and shall die, a firm friend to our present Colonial system. I was bred, as you know, in the good old school, and taught to appreciate the value of our West India possessions."

This letter was published in 1807, by the anti-abolitionist faction; some eighteen months after Nelson's death, and out of context, in an apparent attempt to bolster their cause prior to the parliamentary vote on the Abolition Bill. The wording of the letter as published in 1807—not in Nelson's handwriting, and with a poor facsimile of his signature—appears out of character for Nelson whose many other surviving letters never expressed racist or pro-slavery sentiments. Comparison with the "pressed copy" of the original letter—now part of the Bridport papers held in the British Library—shows that the published copy had 25 alterations, distorting it to give it a more anti-Abolitionist slant. Many of Nelson's actions indicate his position on the matter of slavery, most notably:

 Any West Indian slave escaping to a navy ship, including Nelson's, were signed on, paid, and treated the same as other crew members. At the end of their service they were discharged as free men. In fact, the bronze relief at the base of Nelson's column clearly shows the black George Ryan, aged 23, with musket shooting the French alongside the dying Admiral.
 In 1799, Nelson intervened to secure the release of 24 slaves being held in Portuguese galleys off Palermo.
 In 1802, when it was proposed that West Indian plantation slaves should be replaced by free, paid industrious Chinese workers—Nelson supported the idea.
 In 1805, Nelson rescued the black Haitian General Joseph Chretien, and his servant, from the French. They asked if they could serve with Nelson, and Nelson recommended to the Admiralty that they be paid until they could be discharged and granted passage to Jamaica. The General's mission was to end slavery, a fact of which Nelson was well aware. The general and his servant were well treated and paid.
 The Nelson family used to have a free black servant called Price. Nelson said of him he was "as good a man as ever lived" and he suggested to Emma that she invite the elderly Price to live with them. In the event, Price declined.

Command, 1781–1796

Captain of Albemarle 

Nelson received orders on 23 October 1781, to take the newly refitted Albemarle to sea. He was instructed to collect an inbound convoy of the Russia Company at Elsinore, and escort them back to Britain. For this operation, the Admiralty placed the frigates  and  under his command. Nelson successfully organised the convoy and escorted it into British waters. He then left the convoy to return to port, but severe storms hampered him. Gales almost wrecked Albemarle, as she was a poorly designed ship and an earlier accident had left her damaged, but Nelson eventually brought her into Portsmouth, in February 1782. There, the Admiralty ordered him to fit Albemarle for sea and join the escort for a convoy collecting at Cork, Ireland, to sail for Quebec, Canada. Nelson arrived off Newfoundland with the convoy in late May, then detached on a cruise to hunt American privateers. Nelson was generally unsuccessful; he succeeded only in retaking several captured British merchant ships, and capturing a number of small fishing boats and assorted craft.

In August 1782, Nelson had a narrow escape from a far superior French force under Louis-Philippe de Vaudreuil, only evading them after a prolonged chase. Nelson arrived at Quebec on 18 September. He sailed again as part of the escort for a convoy to New York. He arrived in mid-November and reported to Admiral Samuel Hood, commander of the New York station. At Nelson's request, Hood transferred him to his fleet and Albemarle sailed in company with Hood, bound for the West Indies. On their arrival, the British fleet took up position off Jamaica to await the arrival of de Vaudreuil's force. Nelson and the Albemarle were ordered to scout the numerous passages for signs of the enemy, but it became clear by early 1783 that the French had eluded Hood.

During his scouting operations, Nelson had developed a plan to attack the French garrison of the Turks Islands. Commanding a small flotilla of frigates, and smaller vessels, he landed a force of 167 seamen and marines early on the morning of 8 March, under a supporting bombardment. The French were found to be heavily entrenched and, after several hours, Nelson called off the assault. Several of the officers involved criticised Nelson, but Hood does not appear to have reprimanded him. Nelson spent the rest of the war cruising in the West Indies, where he captured a number of French and Spanish prizes. After news of the peace reached Hood, Nelson returned to Britain in late June 1783.

Island of Nevis, marriage and peace 

Nelson visited France in late 1783 and stayed with acquaintances at Saint-Omer; briefly attempting to learn French during his stay. He returned to England in January 1784, and attended court as part of Lord Hood's entourage. Influenced by the factional politics of the time, he contemplated standing for Parliament as a supporter of William Pitt, but was unable to find a seat.

In 1784, Nelson received command of the frigate , with the assignment to enforce the Navigation Acts in the vicinity of Antigua. The Acts were unpopular with both the Americans and the colonies. Nelson served on the station under Admiral Sir Richard Hughes, and often came into conflict with his superior officer over their differing interpretation of the Acts. The captains of the American vessels Nelson had seized sued him for illegal seizure. Because the merchants of the nearby island of Nevis supported the American claim, Nelson was in peril of imprisonment; he remained sequestered on Boreas for eight months, until the courts ruled in his favour.

In the interim, Nelson met Frances "Fanny" Nisbet, a young widow from a Nevis plantation family. Nelson developed an affection for her. In response, her uncle, John Herbert, offered him a massive dowry. Both Herbert and Nisbet concealed the fact that their famed riches were a fiction, and Fanny did not disclose the fact that she was infertile due to a womb infection. Once they were engaged, Herbert offered Nelson nowhere near the dowry he had promised.

During the Georgian era, breaking a marital engagement was seen as quite dishonourable, and so Nelson and Nisbet were married at Montpelier Estate, on the island of Nevis, on 11 March 1787, shortly before the end of his tour of duty in the Caribbean. The marriage was registered at Fig Tree Church in St John's Parish on Nevis. Nelson returned to England in July, with Fanny following later.

Nelson remained with Boreas until she was paid off in November 1787. He and Fanny then divided their time between Bath and London, occasionally visiting Nelson's relations in Norfolk. In 1788, they settled at Nelson's childhood home at Burnham Thorpe. Now in reserve and on half-pay, he attempted to persuade the Admiralty—and other senior figures he was acquainted with, such as Hood—to provide him with a command. He was unsuccessful, as there were too few ships in the peacetime navy, and Hood did not intercede on his behalf.

Nelson spent his time trying to find employment for former crew members, attending to family affairs, and cajoling contacts in the navy for a posting. In 1792, the French revolutionary government annexed the Austrian Netherlands (modern Belgium), which were traditionally preserved as a buffer state. The Admiralty recalled Nelson to service and gave him command of the 64-gun , in January 1793. On 1 February, France declared war.

Mediterranean service 

In May 1793, Nelson sailed as part of a division under the command of Vice Admiral William Hotham, joined later in the month by the rest of Lord Hood's fleet. The force initially sailed to Gibraltar and—with the intention of establishing naval superiority in the Mediterranean—made their way to Toulon, anchoring off the port in July. Toulon was largely under the control of moderate republicans and royalists, but was threatened by the forces of the National Convention, which were marching on the city. Short of supplies and doubting their ability to defend themselves, the city authorities requested that Hood take it under his protection. Hood readily acquiesced, and sent Nelson to carry dispatches to Sardinia and Naples, requesting reinforcements.

After delivering the dispatches to Sardinia, Agamemnon arrived at Naples in early September. There, Nelson met King Ferdinand IV of Naples, followed by the British ambassador to the kingdom, William Hamilton. At some point during the negotiations for reinforcements, Nelson was introduced to Hamilton's new wife, Emma Hamilton, the former mistress of Hamilton's nephew, Charles Greville.

The negotiations were successful, and 2,000 men and several ships were mustered by mid-September. Nelson put to sea in pursuit of a French frigate, but on failing to catch her, sailed for Leghorn, and then to Corsica. He arrived at Toulon on 5 October, where he found that a large French army had occupied the hills surrounding the city and was bombarding it. Hood still hoped the city could be held if more reinforcements arrived, and sent Nelson to join a squadron operating off Cagliari.

Corsica 

Early on the morning of 22 October 1793, Agamemnon sighted five sails. Nelson closed with them and discovered that they were a French squadron. He promptly gave chase, firing on the 40-gun Melpomene. During the action of 22 October 1793, he inflicted considerable damage, but the remaining French ships turned to join the battle. Realising he was outnumbered, Nelson withdrew and continued to Cagliari, arriving on 24 October. After making repairs, Nelson and Agamemnon sailed for Tunis on 26 October with a squadron under Commodore Robert Linzee.

On his arrival, Nelson was given command of a small squadron consisting of Agamemnon, three frigates, and a sloop, and ordered to blockade the French garrison on Corsica. The fall of Toulon at the end of December 1793 severely damaged British fortunes in the Mediterranean. Hood had failed to make adequate provisions for a withdrawal and 18 French ships-of-the-line fell into republican hands. Nelson's mission to Corsica took on an added significance, as it could provide the British with a naval base close to the French coast. Hood therefore reinforced Nelson with extra ships during January 1794.

A British assault force landed on the island on 7 February, after which, Nelson moved to intensify the blockade off Bastia. For the rest of the month, he carried out raids along the coast and intercepted enemy shipping. By late February, San Fiorenzo had fallen and British troops, under Lieutenant-General David Dundas, entered the outskirts of Bastia. However, Dundas merely assessed the enemy positions and then withdrew, arguing that the French were too well entrenched to risk an assault. Nelson convinced Hood otherwise, but a protracted debate between the army and naval commanders meant that Nelson did not receive permission to proceed until late March. Nelson began to land guns from his ships and emplace them in the hills surrounding the town. On 11 April, the British squadron entered the harbour and opened fire, whilst Nelson took command of the land forces and commenced bombardment. After 45 days, the town surrendered. Nelson then prepared for an assault on Calvi, working in company with Lieutenant-General Charles Stuart.

British forces landed at Calvi on 19 June, and immediately began moving guns ashore to occupy the heights surrounding the town. While Nelson directed a continuous bombardment of the enemy positions, Stuart's men began to advance. On the morning of 12 July, Nelson was at one of the forward batteries when a shot struck one of the nearby sandbags protecting the position, spraying stones and sand. Nelson was struck by debris in his right eye and forced to retire from the position. However, his wound was soon bandaged and he returned to action. By 18 July, most of the enemy positions had been disabled and that night Stuart, supported by Nelson, stormed the main defensive position and captured it. Repositioning their guns, the British brought Calvi under constant bombardment, and the town surrendered on 10 August. Nelson did regain partial sight in his damaged eye after the siege, but by his own account could only "...distinguish light from dark but no object.”

Genoa and the fight of the Ça Ira 

After the occupation of Corsica, Hood ordered Nelson to open diplomatic relations with the city-state of Genoa—a strategically important potential ally. Soon afterwards, Hood returned to England and was succeeded by Admiral William Hotham as commander-in-chief in the Mediterranean. Nelson put into Leghorn and, while Agamemnon underwent repairs, met with other naval officers at the port and entertained a brief affair with a local woman, Adelaide Correglia. Hotham arrived with the rest of the fleet in December, whereupon Nelson and Agamemnon sailed on a number of cruises with them in late 1794 and early 1795.

On 8 March, news reached Hotham that the French fleet was at sea and heading for Corsica. He immediately set out to intercept them, and Nelson eagerly anticipated his first fleet action. The French were reluctant to engage, and the two fleets shadowed each other on 12 March. The following day, two of the French ships collided, allowing Nelson to engage the much larger, 84-gun Ça Ira. This engagement went on for two and a half hours, until the arrival of two French ships forced Nelson to veer away, having inflicted heavy casualties and considerable damage.

The fleets continued to shadow each other before making contact again on 14 March in the Battle of Genoa. Nelson joined the other British ships in attacking the battered Ça Ira, now under tow from Censeur. Heavily damaged, the two French ships were forced to surrender, and Nelson took possession of Censeur. Defeated at sea, the French abandoned their plan to invade Corsica and returned to port.

Skirmishes and the retreat from Italy 

Nelson and the fleet remained in the Mediterranean throughout the summer of 1795. On 4 July, Agamemnon sailed from San Fiorenzo, with a small force of frigates and sloops, bound for Genoa. On 6 July, Nelson ran into the French fleet and found himself pursued by several, much larger ships-of-the-line. He retreated to San Fiorenzo, arriving just ahead of the pursuing French, who broke off as Nelson's signal guns alerted the British fleet in the harbour. Hotham pursued the French to the Hyères Islands, but failed to bring them to a decisive action. A number of small engagements were fought, but to Nelson's dismay, he saw little action.

Nelson returned to operate out of Genoa, intercepting and inspecting merchantmen and cutting-out suspicious vessels, in both enemy and neutral harbours. Nelson formulated ambitious plans for amphibious landings and naval assaults to frustrate the progress of the French Army of Italy, which was now advancing on Genoa, but could excite little interest in Hotham. In November, Hotham was replaced by Sir Hyde Parker, but the situation in Italy was rapidly deteriorating: the French were raiding around Genoa and strong Jacobin sentiment was rife within the city itself.

A large French assault at the end of November, broke the allied lines, forcing a general retreat towards Genoa. Nelson's forces were able to cover the withdrawing army and prevent them from being surrounded, but he had too few ships and men to materially alter the strategic situation. The British were forced to withdraw from the Italian ports. Nelson returned to Corsica on 30 November, angry and depressed with the British failure, and questioning his future in the navy.

Jervis and the evacuation of the Mediterranean 

In January 1796, the position of commander-in-chief of the fleet in the Mediterranean passed to Sir John Jervis, who appointed Nelson to exercise independent command over the ships blockading the French coast as a commodore. Nelson spent the first half of the year conducting operations to frustrate French advances and bolster Britain's Italian allies. Despite some minor successes in intercepting small French warships—such as in the action of 31 May 1796, when Nelson's squadron captured a convoy of seven small vessels—he began to feel the British presence on the Italian peninsula was rapidly becoming useless. In June, the Agamemnon was sent back to Britain for repairs, and Nelson was appointed to the 74-gun .

In the same month, the French thrust towards Leghorn and were certain to capture the city. Nelson hurried there to oversee the evacuation of British nationals and transport them to Corsica. After which, Jervis ordered him to blockade the newly captured French port. In July, he oversaw the occupation of Elba, but by September, the Genoese had broken their neutrality to declare in favour of the French. By October, the Genoese position and continued French advances, led the British to decide that the Mediterranean fleet could no longer be supplied. They ordered it to be evacuated to Gibraltar. Nelson helped oversee the withdrawal from Corsica and, by December 1796, was aboard the frigate HMS Minerve, covering the evacuation of the garrison at Elba. He then sailed for Gibraltar.

During the passage, Nelson captured the Spanish frigate Santa Sabina and placed Lieutenants Jonathan Culverhouse and Thomas Hardy in charge of the captured vessel; taking the frigate's Spanish captain on board Minerve. Santa Sabina was part of a larger Spanish force and, the following morning, two Spanish ships-of-the-line, and a frigate, were sighted closing fast. Unable to outrun them, Nelson was initially determined to fight, but Culverhouse and Hardy raised the British colours and sailed northeast, drawing the Spanish ships after them until being captured, giving Nelson the opportunity to escape. Nelson went on to rendezvous with the British fleet at Elba, where he spent Christmas. He sailed for Gibraltar in late January, and—after learning that the Spanish fleet had sailed from Cartagena—stopped just long enough to collect Hardy, Culverhouse, and the rest of the prize crew captured with Santa Sabina, before pressing on through the straits to join Sir John Jervis off Cadiz.

Admiral, 1797–1801

Battle of Cape St Vincent 

Nelson joined Sir John Jervis' fleet off Cape St Vincent, and reported the Spanish movements. Jervis decided to engage and the two fleets met on 14 February 1797. Nelson found himself towards the rear of the British line and realised that it would be a long time before he could bring Captain into action. Instead of continuing to follow the line, Nelson disobeyed orders and wore ship, breaking from the line and heading to engage the Spanish van—consisting of the 112-gun San Josef, the 80-gun San Nicolas, and the 130-gun Santísima Trinidad.

After an hour of exchanging broadsides, which left both Captain and Culloden badly damaged, Nelson found himself alongside San Nicolas. He led a boarding party across, crying, "Westminster Abbey or glorious victory!" and forced her to surrender. San Josef attempted to come to the San Nicolas' aid, but became entangled with her compatriot and was left immobile. Nelson led his party from the deck of San Nicolas onto San Josef and captured her as well. As night fell, the Spanish fleet broke off and sailed for Cadiz. Four ships had surrendered to the British and two of them were Nelson's.

Nelson was victorious, but had disobeyed direct orders. Jervis liked Nelson and so did not officially reprimand him, but did not mention Nelson's actions in his official report of the battle. He did write a private letter to First Lord of the Admiralty, George Spencer, in which he said that Nelson "contributed very much to the fortune of the day". Nelson also wrote several letters about his victory, reporting that his action was being referred to amongst the fleet as "Nelson's Patent Bridge for boarding first rates".

Nelson's account was later challenged by Rear Admiral William Parker, who had been aboard . Parker claimed that Nelson had been supported by several more ships than he acknowledged, and that San Josef had already struck her colours by the time Nelson boarded her. Nelson's account of his role prevailed, and the victory was well received in Britain; Jervis was made Earl St Vincent and Nelson, on 17 May, was made a Knight of the Bath. On 20 February, in a standard promotion according to his seniority and unrelated to the battle, Nelson was promoted to Rear Admiral of the Blue.

Action off Cadiz 

Nelson was given  as his flagship, and on 27 May 1797, was ordered to lie off Cadiz; monitoring the Spanish fleet and awaiting the arrival of Spanish treasure ships from the American colonies. He carried out a bombardment, and personally led an amphibious assault, on 3 July. During the action, Nelson's barge collided with that of the Spanish commander, and a hand-to-hand struggle ensued between the two crews. Twice, Nelson was nearly cut down and—both times—his life was saved by a seaman named John Sykes, who took the blows himself and was badly wounded. The British raiding force captured the Spanish boat and towed her back to Theseus. During this period, Nelson developed a scheme to capture Santa Cruz de Tenerife, aiming to seize a large quantity of specie from the treasure ship Principe de Asturias, which was reported to have recently arrived.

Battle of Santa Cruz de Tenerife 

The battle plan called for a combination of naval bombardments and an amphibious landing. The initial attempt was called off after adverse currents hampered the assault and the element of surprise was lost. Nelson immediately ordered another assault, but this was beaten back. He prepared for a third attempt, to take place during the night. Although he personally led one of the battalions, the operation ended in failure, as the Spanish were better prepared than had been expected and had secured strong defensive positions.

Several of the boats failed to land at the correct positions in the confusion, while those that did were swept by gunfire and grapeshot. Nelson's boat reached its intended landing point, but as he stepped ashore, he was hit in the right arm by a musketball, which fractured his humerus in multiple places. He was rowed back to Theseus to be attended to by its surgeon, Thomas Eshelby. Upon arriving at his ship, he refused to be helped aboard, declaring:

"Let me alone! I have yet legs left and one arm. Tell the surgeon to make haste and get his instruments. I know I must lose my right arm and the sooner it is off, the better".

Most of the right arm was amputated and, within half an hour, Nelson had returned to issuing orders to his captains. Years later, he would excuse himself to Commodore John Thomas Duckworth for not writing longer letters due to not being naturally left-handed. Later on, he developed the sensation of phantom limb in the area of his amputation and declared that he had "found the direct evidence of the existence of soul".

Meanwhile, a force under Sir Thomas Troubridge had fought their way to the main square but could go no further. Unable to return to the fleet because their boats had been sunk, Troubridge was forced to enter into negotiations with the Spanish commander, and the British were allowed to withdraw. The expedition had failed to achieve any of its objectives and had left a quarter of the landing force dead or wounded.

The squadron remained off Tenerife for a further three days and, by 16 August, had rejoined Lord John Jervis' fleet off Cadiz. Despondently, Nelson wrote to Jervis:

"A left-handed Admiral will never again be considered as useful, therefore the sooner I get to a very humble cottage the better, and make room for a better man to serve the state".

He returned to England, aboard HMS Seahorse, arriving at Spithead on 1 September. He was met with a hero's welcome; the British public had lionised Nelson after Cape St Vincent, and his wound earned him sympathy. They refused to attribute the defeat at Tenerife to him, preferring instead to blame poor planning on the part of St Vincent, the Secretary at War, William Windham, or even Prime Minister William Pitt.

Return to England 

Nelson returned to Bath with Fanny, before moving to London in October 1797, to seek expert medical attention concerning his amputation wound. Whilst in London, news reached him that Admiral Duncan had defeated the Dutch fleet at the Battle of Camperdown. Nelson exclaimed that he would have given his other arm to have been present. He spent the last months of 1797 recuperating in London, during which time, he was awarded the Freedom of the City of London and a pension of £1,000 a year. He used this money to buy Round Wood Farm, near Ipswich, and intended to retire there with Fanny. Despite his plans, Nelson was never to live there.

Although surgeons had been unable to remove the central ligature from his amputation site, which had caused considerable inflammation and infection, it came out of its own accord in early December, and Nelson rapidly began to recover. Eager to return to sea, he began agitating for a command and was promised the 80-gun . As she was not yet ready for sea, Nelson was instead given command of the 74-gun , to which he appointed Edward Berry as his flag captain.

French activities in the Mediterranean theatre were raising concern among the Admiralty as Napoleon was gathering forces in Southern France, but the destination of his army was unknown. Nelson, and the Vanguard, were to be dispatched to Cadiz to reinforce the fleet. On 28 March 1798, Nelson hoisted his flag and sailed to join Earl St Vincent. St Vincent sent him on to Toulon with a small force to reconnoitre French activities.

The Mediterranean

Hunting the French 

Nelson passed through the Straits of Gibraltar, and took up position off Toulon, by 17 May, but his squadron was dispersed and blown southwards by a strong gale which struck the area, on 20 May. While the British were battling the storm, Napoleon had sailed with his invasion fleet under the command of Vice Admiral François-Paul Brueys d'Aigalliers. Nelson, having been reinforced with a number of ships from St Vincent, went in pursuit.

Nelson began searching the Italian coast for Napoleon's fleet, but was hampered by a lack of frigates that could operate as fast scouts. Napoleon had already arrived at Malta and, after a show of force, secured the island's surrender. Nelson followed him there, but by the time he arrived, the French had already left. After a conference with his captains, he decided Napoleon's most likely destination now was Egypt and headed for Alexandria. However, upon Nelson's arrival, on 28 June, he found no sign of the French. Dismayed, he withdrew and began searching to the east of the port. During this time, on 1 July, Napoleon's fleet arrived in Alexandria and landed their forces unopposed. Brueys anchored his fleet in Aboukir Bay, ready to support Napoleon, if required.

Nelson, meanwhile, had crossed the Mediterranean again, in a fruitless attempt to locate the French, and returned to Naples to re-provision. When he again set sail, his intentions were to search the seas off Cyprus, but he decided to pass Alexandria again for a final check. Along the way, his force found and captured a French merchant ship, which provided the first news of the French fleet: they had passed south-east of Crete a month prior—heading to Alexandria. Nelson hurried to the port, but again found it empty of the French. Searching along the coast, he finally discovered the French fleet in Aboukir Bay, on 1 August 1798.

The Battle of the Nile 

Nelson immediately prepared for battle, repeating a sentiment he had expressed at the battle of Cape St Vincent: "Before this time tomorrow, I shall have gained a peerage or Westminster Abbey." It was late by the time the British arrived, and the French—having anchored in a strong position and possessing a combined firepower greater than that of Nelson's fleet—did not expect them to attack. Nelson, however, immediately ordered his ships to advance. The French line was anchored close to a line of shoals, in the belief that this would secure their port side from attack; Brueys had assumed the British would follow convention and attack his centre from the starboard side. However, Captain Thomas Foley, aboard , discovered a gap between the shoals and the French ships, and took Goliath into this channel. The unprepared French found themselves attacked on both sides; the British fleet splitting, with some following Foley and others passing down the starboard side of the French line.

The British fleet was soon heavily engaged, passing down the French line and engaging their ships one by one. Nelson, on Vanguard, personally engaged Spartiate, while also coming under fire from Aquilon. At about eight o'clock, he was with Edward Berry on the quarter-deck, when a piece of French shot struck him in the forehead. He fell to the deck, with a flap of torn skin obscuring his good eye. Blinded and half-stunned, he felt sure he would die and cried out, "I am killed. Remember me to my wife." He was taken below to be seen by the surgeon. After examining Nelson, the surgeon pronounced the wound non-threatening and applied a temporary bandage.

The French van, pounded by British fire from both sides, had begun to surrender, and the victorious British ships continued to move down the line, bringing Brueys' 118-gun flagship Orient under constant, heavy fire. Orient caught fire under this bombardment, and later exploded. Nelson briefly came on deck to direct the battle, but returned to the surgeon after watching the destruction of Orient.

The Battle of the Nile was a major blow to Napoleon's ambitions in the east. The fleet had been destroyed; Orient, another ship and two frigates had been burnt, while seven 74-gun ships and two 80-gun ships had been captured. Only two ships-of-the-line and two frigates escaped. The forces Napoleon had brought to Egypt were stranded. Napoleon attacked north along the Mediterranean coast, but Turkish defenders supported by Captain Sir Sidney Smith defeated his army at the Siege of Acre. Napoleon then left his army and sailed back to France, evading detection by British ships.

Given its strategic importance, historians such as Ernle Bradford, regard Nelson's achievement at the Nile as the most significant of his career, even greater than that at Trafalgar, seven years later.

Rewards 

Nelson wrote dispatches to the Admiralty and oversaw temporary repairs to the Vanguard before sailing to Naples, where he was met with enthusiastic celebrations. King Ferdinand IV of Naples, in company with the Hamiltons, greeted him in person when he arrived at port, and Sir William Hamilton invited Nelson to stay at his home. Celebrations were held in honour of Nelson's birthday that September 1798, and he attended a banquet at the Hamiltons' house, where other officers had begun to notice his attentions to Emma, Lady Hamilton.

Lord Jervis himself had begun to grow concerned about reports of Nelson's behaviour, but in early October, word of Nelson's victory had reached London and overshadowed the matter. The First Lord of the Admiralty, George Spencer, fainted upon hearing the news. Scenes of celebration erupted across the country; balls and victory feasts were held, and church bells were rung. The City of London awarded Nelson, and his captains, swords, whilst the King ordered they be presented with special medals. Emperor Paul I of Russia sent Nelson a gift, and Sultan Selim III of the Ottoman Empire awarded Nelson the Order of the Turkish Crescent, as well as the diamond chelengk from his own turban, for Nelson's role in restoring Ottoman rule to Egypt.

Samuel Hood, after a conversation with the Prime Minister, told Nelson's wife, Fanny, that her husband would likely be given a viscountcy, similarly to Jervis' earldom after Cape St Vincent, and Adam Duncan's viscountcy after Camperdown. Lord Spencer, however, demurred, arguing that as Nelson had only been detached in command of a squadron—rather than being the commander in chief of the fleet—such an award would create an unwelcome precedent. Instead, Nelson received the title of Baron Nelson of the Nile.

Neapolitan campaign 

Nelson was dismayed by Lord Spencer's decision, and declared that he would rather have received no title than that of a mere barony. He was, however, cheered by the attention showered on him by the citizens of Naples, the prestige accorded him by the kingdom's elite, and the comforts he received at the Hamiltons' residence. He made frequent visits to their residence to attend functions in his honour, or tour nearby attractions with Emma, who was almost constantly at his side and with whom, by now, he had fallen deeply in love.

Orders arrived from the Admiralty to blockade the French forces in Alexandria and Malta, a task Nelson delegated to his captains, Samuel Hood and Alexander Ball. Despite enjoying his lifestyle in Naples—even while judging it to be a "country of fiddlers and poets, whores and scoundrels", which he found less than desirable—Nelson began to think of returning to England. However, King Ferdinand IV, had just faced an extended period of pressure from his wife, Maria Carolina of Austria, who was advocating for an aggressive foreign policy towards France; a country which, five years earlier, had beheaded her sister, and its queen, Marie Antoinette. Sir William Hamilton was joined in agreement with Queen Maria Carolina, and the King finally agreed to declare war on France.

The Neapolitan Army, led by the Austrian General Mack, and supported by Nelson's fleet, retook Rome from the French in late November 1798. The French regrouped outside Rome and after being reinforced, routed the Neapolitans. In disarray, the Neapolitan army fled back to Naples, with the pursuing French close behind. Nelson hastily organised the evacuation of the Royal Family, several nobles, and British nationals—including the Hamiltons. The evacuation got underway on 23 December and sailed through heavy gales before reaching the safety of Palermo, on 26 December.

With the departure of the Royal Family, Naples descended into anarchy, and news reached Palermo, in January, that the French had entered the city under General Championnet and proclaimed the Parthenopaean Republic. Nelson was promoted to Rear-Admiral of the Red on 14 February 1799, and was occupied for several months in blockading Naples, while a popular counter-revolutionary force, under Cardinal Ruffo, known as the Sanfedisti, marched to retake the city. In late June, Ruffo's army entered Naples, forcing the French and their supporters to withdraw to the city's fortifications, as rioting and looting broke out amongst the ill-disciplined Neapolitan troops.

Dismayed by the bloodshed, Ruffo agreed to a capitulation with the Jacobin forces, which allowed them safe conduct to France. Nelson arrived off Naples on 24 June, to find the treaty put into effect. His subsequent role is still controversial. Nelson, aboard Foudroyant, was outraged, and backed by King Ferdinand IV, he insisted that the rebels must surrender unconditionally. They refused. Nelson appears to have relented and the Jacobin forces marched out to the awaiting transports. Nelson then had the transports seized.

He took those who had surrendered under the treaty under armed guard, as well as the former Admiral Francesco Caracciolo, who had commanded the Neapolitan navy, under King Ferdinand IV, but had changed sides during the brief Jacobin rule. Nelson ordered his trial by court-martial and refused Caracciolo's request that it be held by British officers. Caracciolo was also not allowed to summon witnesses in his defence and was tried by royalist Neapolitan officers. He was sentenced to death. Caracciolo requested to be shot rather than hanged, but Nelson, following the wishes of Queen Maria Carolina, a close friend of Lady Hamilton, also denied this request, and even ignored the court's request to allow 24 hours for Caracciolo to prepare himself. Caracciolo was hanged aboard the Neapolitan frigate Minerva at 5 o'clock the same afternoon.

Nelson kept the bulk of the Jacobins on the transports and began to hand hundreds over for trial and execution, refusing to intervene, despite pleas for clemency from both the Hamiltons and Queen Maria Carolina. When the transports were finally allowed to carry the Jacobins to France, less than one-third were still alive. On 13 August 1799, in reward for his support of the monarchy, King Ferdinand IV gave Nelson the newly created title Duke of Bronte, in the peerage of the Kingdom of Sicily, as his perpetual property, as well as the estate of the former Benedictine abbey of Santa Maria di Maniace—which he later transformed into the Castello di Nelson—situated between the comunes of Bronte and Maniace, later known as the Duchy of Nelson.

In 1799, Nelson opposed the mistreatment of slaves held in Portuguese galleys off Palermo and intervened to secure their release. Nelson petitioned the Portuguese commander Marquiz de Niza:
"As a friend, as an English admiral – as a favour to me, as a favour to my country – that you will give me the Slaves".
The marquis acquiesced to the unusual request, allowing twenty-four slaves to be transferred to HMS Bonne Citoyenne; their blessings to Nelson ringing out across the harbour, as their names were added to the sloop's already crowded muster book.

Siege of Malta

Nelson returned to Palermo in August, and in September, became the senior officer in the Mediterranean, after Lord John Jervis' successor, George Elphinstone, 1st Viscount Keith, left to chase the French and Spanish fleets into the Atlantic. Nelson spent most of 1799 at the Neapolitan court, but put to sea again in February 1800, after Lord Keith's return. Keith ordered Nelson to assist in the siege of Malta - of which the Royal Navy was conducting a tight blockade. On 18 February, Généreux—a survivor of the Battle of the Nile—was sighted and Nelson gave chase, capturing her after a short battle, and winning Keith's approval.  Nelson and the Hamiltons sailed aboard the Foudroyant from Naples, on a brief cruise around Malta, in April 1800 and anchored at Marsa Sirocco. Here Nelson and Emma lived together openly, and were hosted by Thomas Troubridge and Thomas Graham. It was during this time that Nelson and Lady Emma Hamilton's illegitimate daughter, Horatia Nelson, was likely conceived.

Nelson had a difficult relationship with his superior officer; he was gaining a reputation for insubordination, having initially refused to send ships when Keith requested them, and on occasion, returning to Palermo without orders, pleading poor health. Keith's reports, and rumours of Nelson's close relationship with Emma Hamilton, were now circulating around London, and Lord Spencer wrote a pointed letter suggesting that he return home: You will be more likely to recover your health and strength in England than in any inactive situation at a foreign Court, however pleasing the respect and gratitude shown to you for your services may be.

Return to England 

The recall of Sir William Hamilton to Britain was a further incentive for Nelson to return. In June Nelson left Malta and conveyed Queen Maria Carolina, and her suite, to Leghorn. Keith travelled to Leghorn to demand, in person, an explanation, and refused to be moved by the Queen's pleas to allow her to be conveyed in a British ship. In the face of Keith's demands, Nelson reluctantly struck his flag and bowed to Lady Hamilton's request to return to England over land.

Nelson, the Hamiltons, and several other British travellers, left Leghorn for Florence, on 13 July. They made stops at Trieste and Vienna, spending three weeks in the latter, where they were entertained by the local nobility and heard the Missa in Angustiis by Haydn, which now bears Nelson's name. Haydn would meet them that August when they visited Eisenstaedt.  By September, they were in Prague, and later called at Dresden, Dessau and Hamburg; from there, they caught a packet ship to Great Yarmouth, arriving on 6 November. Nelson was given a hero's welcome, and after being sworn in as a freeman of the borough, received the amassed crowd's applause. He then made his way to London, arriving on 9 November.

He attended court and was guest of honour at a number of banquets and balls. During this period, Fanny Nelson and Lady Emma Hamilton met for the first time; Nelson was reported as being cold and distant to his wife, while his attentions to Lady Hamilton and her obesity became the subject of gossip. With the marriage breaking down, Nelson began to hate even being in the same room as Fanny. Events came to a head around Christmas, when according to Nelson's solicitor, Fanny issued an ultimatum on whether he was to choose her or Lady Hamilton. Nelson replied: I love you sincerely but I cannot forget my obligations to Lady Hamilton or speak of her otherwise than with affection and admiration. The two never lived together again.

The Baltic 

Shortly after his arrival in England, Nelson was appointed to be second-in-command of the Channel Fleet, under Lord John Jervis. He was promoted to Vice-Admiral of the Blue on 1 January 1801, and travelled to Plymouth, where on 22 January, he was granted the freedom of the city. On 29 January 1801, Lady Emma Hamilton gave birth to their daughter, Horatia.

Tired of British ships imposing a blockade against French trade and stopping and searching their merchantmen, the Russian, Prussian, Danish and Swedish governments had formed an alliance to break the blockade. Nelson joined Admiral Sir Hyde Parker's fleet at Yarmouth, from where they sailed for the Danish coast in March. On their arrival, Parker was inclined to blockade Denmark and control the entrance to the Baltic, but Nelson urged a pre-emptive attack on the Danish fleet in the harbour of Copenhagen. He convinced Parker to allow him to make an assault and was given significant reinforcements. Parker himself would wait in the Kattegat, covering Nelson's fleet in case of the arrival of the Swedish or Russian fleets.

Battle of Copenhagen 

On the morning of 2 April 1801, Nelson began to advance into Copenhagen harbour. The battle began badly for the British, with HMS Agamemnon,  and  running aground, and the rest of the fleet encountering heavier fire from the Danish shore batteries than had been anticipated. Sir Hyde Parker sent the signal for Nelson to withdraw, reasoning:I will make the signal for recall for Nelson's sake. If he is in a condition to continue the action he will disregard it; if he is not, it will be an excuse for his retreat and no blame can be attached to him. Nelson, directing action aboard , was informed of the signal by the signal lieutenant, Frederick Langford, but angrily responded: "I told you to look out on the Danish commodore and let me know when he surrendered. Keep your eyes fixed on him." He then turned to his flag captain, Thomas Foley, and said "You know, Foley, I have only one eye. I have a right to be blind sometimes." He raised the telescope to his blind eye, and said "I really do not see the signal."

The battle lasted three hours, leaving both Danish and British fleets heavily damaged. At length, Nelson dispatched a letter to the Danish commander, Crown Prince Frederick, calling for a truce, which the Prince accepted. Parker approved of Nelson's actions in retrospect, and Nelson was given the honour of going into Copenhagen the next day to open formal negotiations. At a banquet that evening, he told Prince Frederick that the battle had been the most severe he had ever participated in. The outcome of the battle—and several weeks of ensuing negotiations—was a fourteen-week armistice, with Nelson becoming commander-in-chief in the Baltic Sea, upon Parker's recall in May.

As a reward for the victory, he was created Viscount Nelson of the Nile and of Burnham Thorpe in the County of Norfolk, on 19 May 1801. In addition, on 4 August 1801, he was created Baron Nelson of the Nile and of Hilborough in the County of Norfolk, with a special remainder to his father and sisters. Nelson sailed to the Russian naval base at Reval in May, and there learnt that the pact of armed neutrality was to be disbanded. Satisfied with the outcome of the expedition, he returned to England, arriving on 1 July.

Leave in England, 1801–1803 
In France, Napoleon was amassing forces to invade Great Britain. After a brief spell in London, where he again visited the Hamiltons, Nelson was placed in charge of defending the English Channel to prevent the invasion. He spent the summer of 1801 reconnoitring the French coast, but apart from a failed attack on Boulogne in August, saw little action. On 1 October, the Peace of Amiens was signed between the British and the French, and Nelson—in poor health again—retired once more to Britain, where he stayed with Sir William and Lady Hamilton. On 30 October, Nelson spoke in support of the Addington government in the House of Lords, and afterwards, made regular visits to attend sessions.

Grand tour 
In the summer of 1802, Nelson, and the Hamiltons, embarked on a tour of England and Wales, visiting Oxford (Star Inn), Woodstock, Oxfordshire 4th Duke of Marlborough - Blenheim Palace, Gloucester, Forest of Dean, Ross-on-Wye, then by river to Monmouth, Abergavenny, Brecon, Carmarthen, Milford Haven (New Inn), Tenby, Swansea, Carmarthen, Merthyr Tydfil (Star Inn) visited Cyfartha Ironworks to see the place were the 104 guns had been made for his flagship, HMS Victory, Ffos y Gerddinen coaching inn, now both village and inn renamed Nelson, Caerphilly, Monmouth (Beaufort Arms), Hereford, Ludlow, Worcester (Hop Pole Inn), Birmingham (Styles hotel), Warwick, Althorp (Lord Spencer) and returning to Merton Place Sunday 5 September  passing through numerous other towns and villages along the way. Nelson often found himself received as a hero, (except at Woodstock) and was the centre of celebrations and events held in his honour.

In September, Lady Hamilton purchased Merton Place, a country estate in Merton, Surrey (now within the borders of south-west London) for Nelson, where he lived with the Hamiltons until William's death, on 6 April 1803. The following month, war broke out once again, and Nelson prepared to return to sea.

Witness at the treason trial of Edward Despard

In January 1803, Nelson appeared as a character witness in the treason trial of a former comrade in arms, Colonel Edward Despard. Despard, who had been moving in radical circles in London—a member both of the London Corresponding Society and the United Irishmen—was the alleged ringleader of a conspiracy to assassinate King George III and seize the Tower of London; the so-called Despard Plot. In court, Nelson recollected his service with Despard in the Caribbean, during the American War:

"We went on the Spanish Main together; we slept many nights together in our clothes upon the ground; we have measured the height of the enemies walls together. In all that period of time, no man could have shewn more zealous attachment to his Sovereign and his Country".

Under cross-examination, however, Nelson had to concede to having "lost sight of Despard for the last twenty years".

Nelson directed a further plea for clemency to Prime Minister Henry Addington, who was later to tell Nelson that "he and his family had sat up after supper, weeping over the letter".  Following Despard's execution in February, Lady Fanny Nelson is reported to have taken the Colonel's Jamaican wife, Catherine Despard, under her "protection".

Return to sea, 1803

Nelson was appointed commander-in-chief of the Mediterranean Fleet and given the first-rate  as his flagship. He joined her at Portsmouth, where he received orders to sail to Malta and take command of a squadron there, before joining the blockade of Toulon. Nelson arrived off Toulon in July 1803, and spent the next year and a half enforcing the blockade. He was promoted to Vice-Admiral of the White while still at sea, on 23 April 1804. In January 1805, the French fleet, under the command of Admiral Pierre-Charles Villeneuve, escaped Toulon and eluded the blockading British. Nelson set off in pursuit, but after searching the eastern Mediterranean, learnt the French had been blown back into Toulon. Villeneuve managed to break out a second time in April, and this time, succeeded in passing through the Strait of Gibraltar, and into the Atlantic—bound for the West Indies.

Nelson gave chase, but after arriving in the Caribbean, spent June in a fruitless search for the fleet. Villeneuve had briefly cruised around the islands, before heading back to Europe, in contravention of Napoleon's orders. The returning French fleet was intercepted by a British fleet, under Sir Robert Calder, and engaged in the Battle of Cape Finisterre, but managed to reach Ferrol with only minor losses. Nelson returned to Gibraltar at the end of July, and travelled from there to England, dismayed at his failure to bring the French to battle and expecting to be censured.

To his surprise, he was given a rapturous reception from crowds who had gathered to view his arrival. Senior British officials congratulated him for sustaining the close pursuit, crediting him with saving the West Indies from a French invasion. Nelson briefly stayed in London, where he was cheered wherever he went, before visiting Merton Place to see Lady Hamilton, arriving in late August. He entertained a number of his friends and relations there over the coming month, and began plans for a grand engagement with the enemy fleet, one that would surprise his foes by forcing a pell-mell battle on them.

Captain Henry Blackwood arrived at Merton early on 2 September, bringing news that the French and Spanish fleets had combined and were currently at anchor in Cádiz. Nelson hurried to London, where he met with cabinet ministers and was given command of the fleet blockading Cádiz. It was while awaiting one of these meetings, on 24 September, with Lord Castlereagh, the Secretary of State for War and the Colonies, that Nelson and Major General Arthur Wellesley—the future Duke of Wellington—met briefly in a waiting area. Wellington was waiting to be debriefed on his Indian operations, and Nelson on his chase and future plans. Wellington later recalled, "[Nelson] entered at once into conversation with me, if I can call it conversation, for it was almost all on his side and all about himself and, in reality, a style so vain and so silly as to surprise and almost disgust me". After a few minutes, Nelson left the room, but having then been informed who his companion had been, returned and entered into a more earnest and intelligent discussion with the young Wellesley. This lasted for a quarter of an hour, and encompassed topics such as the war, the state of the colonies, and the geopolitical situation. On this second discussion, Wellesley recalled, "I don't know that I ever had a conversation that interested me more". This was the only meeting between the two men.

Nelson returned briefly to Merton to set his affairs in order, and bid farewell to Emma, before travelling back to London and then on to Portsmouth; arriving there early on the morning of 14 September. He breakfasted at the George Inn with his friends George Rose, the Vice-President of the Board of Trade, and George Canning, the Treasurer of the Navy. During the breakfast, word spread of Nelson's presence at the inn and a large crowd of well-wishers gathered. They accompanied Nelson to his barge and cheered him off, which Nelson acknowledged by raising his hat. He was recorded as having turned to his colleague and stated: "I had their huzzas before; I have their hearts now." Robert Southey reported on the onlookers for Nelson's walk to the dock: "Many were in tears and many knelt down before him and blessed him as he passed."

Victory joined the British fleet off Cádiz, on 27 September, and Nelson took over from Vice Admiral Cuthbert Collingwood. Nelson spent the following weeks preparing and refining his tactics for the anticipated battle, and dining with his captains to ensure they understood his intentions. He had devised a plan of attack that anticipated the allied fleet would form up in a traditional line of battle. Drawing on his own experience from the Nile and Copenhagen, and the examples of Duncan at Camperdown and Rodney at the Saintes, Nelson decided to split his fleet into squadrons rather than forming it into a similar line parallel to the enemy. These squadrons would then cut the enemy's line in a number of places, allowing a pell-mell battle to develop. The British ships could overwhelm and destroy parts of their opponents' formation, before unengaged enemy ships could come to their aid.

Battle of Trafalgar, 1805

Preparation 

The combined French and Spanish fleet under Villeneuve's command numbered thirty-three ships of the line. Napoleon had intended for Villeneuve to sail into the English Channel and cover a planned invasion of Britain. However, the entry of Austria and Russia into the war forced Napoleon to call off this invasion, and transfer troops to Germany. Villeneuve had been reluctant to risk engagement with the British and this reluctance led Napoleon to send Vice-Admiral François Rosily to Cádiz, in order to take command of the fleet. Rosily was then to sail it into the Mediterranean and land troops at Naples, before making port at Toulon. Villeneuve decided to sail the fleet out before his successor could arrive. On 20 October 1805, the fleet was sighted making its way out of harbour, by patrolling British frigates, and Nelson was informed that they appeared to be heading to the west.

At four o'clock in the morning of 21 October, Nelson ordered the Victory to turn towards the approaching enemy fleet, and signalled the rest of his force to battle stations. He then went below and made out his will, before returning to the quarterdeck to carry out an inspection. Despite having twenty-seven ships to Villeneuve's thirty-three, Nelson was confident of success, declaring that he would not be satisfied with taking fewer than twenty prizes. He returned briefly to his cabin to write a final prayer, after which he joined Victory'''s signal lieutenant, John Pasco. Mr Pasco, I wish to say to the fleet "England confides that every man will do his duty". You must be quick, for I have one more signal to make, which is for close action. Pasco suggested changing confides to expects which, being in the Signal Book, could be signalled by the use of a single code (three flags), whereas confides would have to be spelt out letter by letter. Nelson agreed, and the signal was hoisted.

As the fleets converged, Victory's Captain Thomas Hardy, suggested that Nelson remove the decorations on his coat, so that he would not be so easily identified by enemy sharpshooters. Nelson replied that it was too late "to be shifting a coat", adding that they were "military orders and he did not fear to show them to the enemy". Captain Henry Blackwood, of the frigate , suggested Nelson come aboard his ship to better observe the battle. Nelson refused, and also turned down Hardy's suggestion to let Admiral Sir Eliab Harvey's  come ahead of Victory and lead the line into battle.

 Battle is joined Victory came under fire, initially passing wide, but then with greater accuracy as the distances decreased. A cannonball struck and killed Nelson's secretary, John Scott, nearly cutting him in two. Hardy's clerk then took over, but he too, was almost immediately killed. Victorys wheel was shot away; another cannonball cut down eight marines. Standing next to Nelson on the quarterdeck, Hardy's shoe buckle was suddenly dented by a splinter. Nelson observed, "This is too warm work to last long."Victory had, by now, reached the enemy line and Hardy asked Nelson which ship to engage first. Nelson told him to take his pick, whereupon Hardy moved Victory across the stern of the 80-gun French flagship, Bucentaure. Victory then came under fire from the 74-gun Redoutable, which was lying off Bucentaures stern, as well as the 130-gun Santísima Trinidad. As sharpshooters from the enemy ships fired onto Victorys deck from their rigging, Nelson and Hardy continued directing and giving orders.

 Wounding and death 

At a quarter-past one in the afternoon, Hardy realised that Nelson was not by his side. He turned to see Nelson kneeling on the deck, supporting himself with his hand, before falling onto his side. Hardy rushed to him, at which point, Nelson smiled: Hardy, I do believe they have done it at last .... my backbone is shot through.

He had been hit by a musket ball, fired from the mizzen-top of Redoutable, at a range of 50 feet (15 m). The ball entered his left shoulder, passed through a lung, then his spine at the sixth and seventh thoracic vertebrae, and lodged two inches (5 cm) below his right shoulder blade, in the muscles of his back. Nelson was carried below to the cockpit, by sergeant major of marines Robert Adair, and two seamen. As he was being carried down, he asked them to pause while he gave advice to a midshipman on the handling of the tiller. He then draped a handkerchief over his face to avoid causing alarm amongst the crew. He was taken to ship surgeon William Beatty, telling him: You can do nothing for me. I have but a short time to live. My back is shot through. Nelson was made comfortable, fanned, and brought lemonade and watered wine to drink, after he complained of feeling hot and thirsty. He asked several times to see Hardy, who was on deck supervising the battle, and asked Beatty to remember him to Emma, his daughter, and his friends.

Hardy came belowdecks to see Nelson, just after half-past two, and informed him that a number of enemy ships had surrendered. Nelson told him that he was sure to die, and begged him to pass his possessions on to Emma. Those with Nelson, at this point, were the chaplain Alexander Scott, the purser Walter Burke, Nelson's steward, Chevalier, and Beatty. Nelson, fearing that a gale was blowing up, instructed Hardy to be sure to anchor. After reminding him to "take care of poor Lady Hamilton", Nelson said: "Kiss me, Hardy". Beatty recorded that Hardy knelt and kissed Nelson on the cheek. He then stood for a minute or two, before kissing Nelson on the forehead. Nelson asked, "Who is that?" On hearing that it was Hardy, he replied, "God bless you, Hardy."

By now very weak, Nelson continued to murmur instructions to Burke and Scott, "fan, fan ... rub, rub ... drink, drink." Beatty had heard Nelson murmur, "Thank God I have done my duty", and when he returned, Nelson's voice had faded and his pulse was very weak. Nelson looked up, as Beatty took his pulse, then closed his eyes. Scott, who remained by Nelson as he died, recorded his last words as, "God and my country". Nelson died at half-past four in the afternoon, three hours after he had been shot.  He was 47 years old.

 Return to England 

Nelson's body was placed in a cask of brandy mixed with camphor and myrrh, which was then lashed to the Victorys mainmast and placed under guard. Victory was towed to Gibraltar after the battle, and on arrival the body was transferred to a lead-lined coffin filled with spirits of wine. Collingwood's dispatches about the battle were carried to England aboard , and when the news arrived in London, a messenger was sent to Merton Place to bring the news of Nelson's death to Emma Hamilton. She later recalled, They brought me word, Mr Whitby from the Admiralty. "Show him in directly", I said. He came in, and with a pale countenance and faint voice, said, "We have gained a great Victory." – "Never mind your Victory", I said. "My letters – give me my letters" – Captain Whitby was unable to speak – tears in his eyes and a deathly paleness over his face made me comprehend him. I believe I gave a scream and fell back, and for ten hours I could neither speak nor shed a tear.

King George III, on receiving the news, is alleged to have said, in tears, "We have lost more than we have gained." The Times reported: We do not know whether we should mourn or rejoice. The country has gained the most splendid and decisive Victory that has ever graced the naval annals of England; but it has been dearly purchased.

 Funeral 

Nelson's body was unloaded from the Victory at the Nore. It was conveyed upriver, in Commander Sir George Grey's yacht Chatham, to Greenwich and placed inside a lead coffin. The lead coffin was then placed inside a wooden one, made from the mast of L'Orient, which had been salvaged after the Battle of the Nile.

He lay in state for three days in the Painted Hall of Greenwich Hospital, where the surrounding arrangements all but disintegrated, under the crush of crowds far greater than authorities had anticipated. His body was then taken upriver, aboard a barge originally used as King Charles II's state barge; accompanied by Lord Samuel Hood, chief mourner Sir Peter Parker, and the Prince of Wales. The Prince of Wales, at first, announced his intention of attending the funeral as chief mourner. However, he ultimately attended in a private capacity, along with his brothers, when his father, King George III, reminded him that it was against protocol for the heir to the throne to attend the funerals of anyone except members of the royal family.

On 8 January 1806, the coffin was taken into the Admiralty for the night, attended by Nelson's chaplain, Alexander Scott. The following day, 9 January, a funeral procession consisting of 32 admirals, over a hundred captains, and an escort of 10,000 soldiers took the coffin from the Admiralty to St Paul's Cathedral. After a four-hour service, he was interred within a crypt, in a sarcophagus originally carved for Cardinal Wolsey; the sarcophagus and its base had been previously taken over for the tomb of Henry VIII, which was never completed. The sailors charged with folding the flag, which they were to then place on Nelson's coffin after it had been lowered through the floor of the nave, instead tore it into fragments, each taking a piece as a memorial of their fallen commander.

 Assessment 

Nelson was regarded as a highly effective leader, and someone who was able to sympathise with the needs of his men. He based his command on love, rather than authority, inspiring both his superiors and his subordinates with his considerable courage, commitment and charisma—dubbed "the Nelson touch".Lambert 2004, xvii Nelson combined this talent with an adept grasp of strategy and politics, making him a highly successful naval commander. Admiral Togo, himself often called "the Nelson of the East", placed Nelson as among the greatest naval commanders in history—second only to Admiral Yi Sun-sin. The memorandum Nelson wrote before Trafalgar expresses his attitude well: "No captain can do very wrong if he places his ship alongside that of the enemy."

Nelson's personality was complex, often characterised by a desire to be noticed—both by his superiors and the public. He was easily flattered by praise, and dismayed when he felt he was not given sufficient credit for his actions. This led him to take risks, and to enthusiastically publicise his resultant successes, which was not always considered acceptable at the time. Nelson was also highly confident in his abilities, determined and able to make important decisions. His active career meant that he was considerably experienced in combat and was a shrewd judge of his opponents, able to identify and exploit his enemies' weaknesses.

He was often prone to insecurities, however, as well as violent mood swings, and was extremely vain; he loved to receive decorations and tributes. Despite his personality, he remained a highly professional leader and was driven all his life by a strong sense of duty. Nelson's fame reached new heights after his death, and he came to be regarded as one of Britain's greatest military heroes, ranked alongside the Duke of Marlborough and Duke of Wellington. In the BBC's 100 Greatest Britons programme in 2002, Nelson was voted the ninth greatest Briton of all time.

Aspects of Nelson's life and career were controversial, both during his lifetime and after his death. His affair with Emma Hamilton was widely remarked upon, and disapproved of, to the extent that Emma was denied permission to attend his funeral. She and their daughter, Horatia, were also subsequently ignored by the government, which awarded Nelson's money and titles only to legitimate family. Nelson's actions during the reoccupation of Naples have also been the subject of debate. His approval of the wave of reprisals against the Jacobins, who had surrendered under the terms agreed by Cardinal Ruffo, as well as his personal intervention in securing the execution of Francesco Caracciolo, are considered by some biographers, such as Robert Southey, to have been a shameful breach of honour. A prominent contemporary, politician Charles James Fox, was among those who attacked Nelson for his actions at Naples, declaring in the House of Commons: I wish that the atrocities of which we hear so much and which I abhor as much as any man, were indeed unexampled. I fear that they do not belong exclusively to the French – Naples for instance has been what is called "delivered", and yet, if I am rightly informed, it has been stained and polluted by murders so ferocious, and by cruelties of every kind so abhorrent, that the heart shudders at the recital ... [The besieged rebels] demanded that a British officer should be brought forward, and to him they capitulated. They made terms with him under the sanction of the British name. Before they sailed their property was confiscated, numbers were thrown into dungeons, and some of them, I understand, notwithstanding the British guarantee, were actually executed. Other pro-republican writers produced books and pamphlets decrying the events in Naples as atrocities. Later assessments, including one by Andrew Lambert, have stressed that the armistice had not been authorised by the King of Naples, and that the retribution meted out by the Neapolitans was not unusual for the time. Lambert also suggests that Nelson, in fact, acted to put an end to the bloodshed; using his ships and men to restore order in the city.

 Legacy 

Nelson's influence continued long after his death, and saw periodic revivals of interest, especially during times of crisis in Britain. In the 1860s, Poet Laureate Alfred Tennyson appealed to the image and tradition of Nelson, in order to oppose the defence cuts being made by Prime Minister William Ewart Gladstone. First Sea Lord Jackie Fisher was a keen exponent of Nelson during the early years of the twentieth century, and often emphasised his legacy during his period of naval reform. Winston Churchill also found Nelson to be a source of inspiration during the Second World War.

Nelson has been frequently depicted in art and literature; appearing in paintings by Benjamin West and Arthur William Devis, and in books and biographies by John McArthur, James Stanier Clarke and Robert Southey. Nelson is also celebrated and commemorated in numerous songs, written both during his life and following his death. Nelson's victory in the Battle of the Nile is commemorated in "The Battle of the Nile: a favourite patriotic song". Thomas Attwood's "Nelson's Tomb: A Favourite Song" commemorates Nelson's death in the Battle of Trafalgar. In 1797, the famous composer Haydn wrote a mass to commemorate Nelson’s stunning defeat over Napoleon and the French.  In 1800, Nelson visited Eisenstadt for four days and most certainly saw Haydn’s new mass and in response he met and  gave the elderly Haydn a watch he wore during the battle.

The city of Nelson in New Zealand is named after him.

A number of monuments and memorials were constructed across the country, and abroad, to honour his memory and achievements. Dublin's monument to Nelson, Nelson's Pillar, completed in 1809, was destroyed by Irish republicans in 1966. In Montreal, a statue was started in 1808 and completed in 1809. In Great Yarmouth, on the coast in his home county of Norfolk, the Britannia Monument (aka the Norfolk Naval Pillar) to Nelson was erected in 1819, with dedications at the base to his four main naval victories. Others followed around the world, with London's Trafalgar Square being created in his memory in 1835 and the centrepiece, Nelson's Column, finished in 1843. A Royal Society of Arts blue plaque was unveiled in 1876, to commemorate Nelson, at 147 New Bond Street. The architect of the Britannia Royal Naval College, Dartmouth, Sir Aston Webb placed a window high in the chapel such that annually, on 21 October at the time of Nelson's death, the light from it falls on the statue of Christ behind the altar.

Nelson and his monuments are seen more critically in countries that felt the negative aspects of colonialism, and who may seek to revise their public history. Major public memorials in primary locations in some cities have been subject to protest and removal as conscious acts. In 1966, the Nelson Pillar in Dublin was blown up by Irish Republicans: a novelty folk song, "Up went Nelson", topped the Irish pop charts in the wake of the explosion, while a newspaper article marking the 55th anniversary noted: "For many, the biggest surprise about the blowing up of Nelson’s Pillar...is why it took 157 years. The resentment had run deep. Almost fifty years after the 1916 Rising an Englishman still towered over every other notable in the city, many groused."  Across the Atlantic, in the Caribbean in 2020, after years of campaigning, the Nelson Statue in National Heroes Square, Bridgetown, Barbados, was removed and placed in a museum. It had stood since 1813, in a central public space of the capital known until 1999 as Trafalgar Square. The Barbadian Prime Minister Mia Mottley said at the ceremony marking the statue's removal:
"National Heroes Square must reflect our heroes. And ... while we accept that the statue of the vice admiral Lord Horatio Nelson is an important historic relic, it is not a relic to be placed in the National Heroes Square of a nation that has had to fight for too long to shape its destiny and to forge a positive future for its citizens."

 Titles 

Nelson's titles, as inscribed on his coffin and read out at the funeral by the Garter King at Arms, Sir Isaac Heard, were: The Most Noble Lord Horatio Nelson, Viscount and Baron Nelson, of the Nile and of Burnham Thorpe in the County of Norfolk, Baron Nelson of the Nile and of Hilborough in the said County, Knight of the Most Honourable Order of the Bath, Vice Admiral of the White Squadron of the Fleet, Commander in Chief of his Majesty's Ships and Vessels in the Mediterranean, Duke of Bronte in the Kingdom of Sicily, Knight Grand Cross of the Sicilian Order of St Ferdinand and of Merit, Member of the Ottoman Order of the Crescent, Knight Grand Commander of the Order of Saint Joachim.

Nelson received large Naval Gold Medals for the battles of St Vincent, the Nile and, posthumously, Trafalgar, one of very few recipients of three such medals. Nelson was granted a royal license in 1802 to receive and wear the foreign Order of Saint Joachim.

He was a Colonel of Marines from 1795 to 1797 and voted a Freeman of the cities and boroughs of London (10 March 1797), Bath, Salisbury, Exeter (15 January 1801), Plymouth, Monmouth, Sandwich, Oxford (22 July 1802), Hereford, Haverfordwest (in 1802) and Worcester (30 August 1802). The University of Oxford, in full Congregation, bestowed the honorary degree of Doctor of Civil Law upon Nelson on 30 July 1802.

In 1799, Nelson was created Duke of Bronte (Italian: Duca di Bronte), of the Kingdom of Sicily (after 1816, existing in the nobility of the Kingdom of the Two Sicilies), by King Ferdinand III of Sicily, and after briefly experimenting with the signature "Brontë Nelson of the Nile", he signed himself "Nelson & Brontë" for the rest of his life. Nelson had no legitimate children; his daughter, Horatia, married the Reverend Philip Ward, with whom she had ten children before her death in 1881.

Since Nelson died without legitimate issue, his viscountcy and his barony created in 1798, both "of the Nile and of Burnham Thorpe in the County of Norfolk", became extinct upon his death. However, the barony created in 1801, "of the Nile and of Hilborough in the County of Norfolk", passed by a special remainder, which included Nelson's father and sisters and their male issue, to William Nelson, who was Nelson's older brother. In November 1805, William Nelson was created Earl Nelson and Viscount Merton, of Trafalgar and of Merton in the County of Surrey, in recognition of his late brother's services, and he also inherited the dukedom of Bronte.

 Armorial bearings 

Arms were granted and confirmed on 20 October 1797. Nelson's paternal arms (Or, a cross flory sable over all a bendlet gules) were augmented to honour his naval victories. After the Battle of Cape St Vincent (14 February 1797), Nelson was created a Knight of the Bath and was granted heraldic supporters (appropriate for peers) of a sailor and a lion.

In honour of the Battle of the Nile in 1798, the Crown granted him an augmentation of honour blazoned On a chief wavy argent a palm tree between a disabled ship and a ruinous battery all issuant from waves of the sea all proper (deemed a notorious example of debased heraldry), the Latin motto Palmam qui meruit ferat ("let him who has earned it bear the palm"), and added to his supporters a palm branch in the hand of the sailor and in the paw of the lion, and a "tri-colored flag and staff in the mouth of the latter".

After Nelson's death, his elder brother and heir William Nelson, 1st Earl Nelson, was granted a further augmentation: On a fess wavy overall azure the word TRAFALGAR or. This additional augmentation was not used by those who succeeded him in the earldom, including the present Earl Nelson.

The Garter King of Arms wrote the following explanation of the arms to Nelson's wife:In the Chief of the Arms a Palm Tree (emblematic of Victory) between a disabled Ship and a ruinous Battery, form striking memorials of the glorious event of 1 August (1798), in the Bay of Aboukir, near the Mouth of the Nile. In the Crest, the Chelengk (a more minute description of which I had the pleasure of delivering to your Ladyship) is an indication of the distinctions rendered to his Lordship's merits by the Grand Signior; and the Naval Crown may bear a striking allusion to his Lordship's victory in those Seas, where the Corona Navalis was first conferred by the Romans on persons who had eminently distinguished themselves in Naval combats. The Palm Branch in the hand of the Sailor, and in the paw of the Lion, is a continuation of the emblem in the Chief of the Arms, as well as allusive to the Motto, "Palmam qui meruit ferat" ("let he who earns the palm bear it"). The tri-coloured Flag of the subdued Enemy was added to, and involved with, the Colours in the mouth of the Lion, which had been granted to his Lordship in commemoration of his distinguished gallantry and services, on 14 February 1797. With regard to your Ladyship's question—whether Lord Nelson is, in consequence of the Royal Warrant, precluded from the use of his Crest of the San Josef (a ship he won in battle from the Spaniards), I have no hesitation in giving my decided opinion, that he may bear it, with his new Crest, at his own pleasure.

The herald Wilfrid Scott-Giles (d.1982) wrote a jocular verse describing the successive augmentations to the Nelson arms, ending with the line "But where, alas! is Nelson's ancient cross?"

 See also 
 Bibliography of 18th–19th century Royal Naval history
 Nelson hold
 Turning a blind eye

 Notes 

 References 

 Bibliography 

 
 
 
 
 
 
 
 
 
 
 
 
 
 
 
 
 
 
 Nelson, Horatio, Lord Viscount, The Dispatches and Letters of Vice Admiral Lord Viscount Nelson: With Notes by Sir Nicholas Harris Nicolas G.C.M.G., The First Volume, 1777 to August 1794, Henry Colburn, London, 1844
 Nelson, Horatio, Lord Viscount, The Dispatches and Letters of Vice Admiral Lord Viscount Nelson: With Notes by Sir Nicholas Harris Nicolas G.C.M.G., The Third Volume, January 1798 to August 1799,'' Henry Colburn, London, 1845

Further reading 

 
 
 
 
 
 
 , E'book
 
 
 
 , E'book v1, E'book v2
  (reissued by Cambridge University Press, 2010. )
  (reissued by Cambridge University Press, 2010. )

External links 

 
 
 
 
 Collections related to Nelson held by the National Maritime Museum
 The Nelson Society
 Norfolk Nelson Museum
 Original Letters Written by Horatio Nelson  Shapell Manuscript Foundation
 An essay on Nelson in The Oxonian Review of Books
 Nelson, history
 Review of A. T. Mahan's biography 

|-

 
1758 births
1805 deaths
Barons Nelson
British military personnel killed in action in the Napoleonic Wars
British naval commanders of the Napoleonic Wars
Royal Navy personnel of the French Revolutionary Wars
Burials at St Paul's Cathedral
Deaths by firearm in Spain
English amputees
Knights Companion of the Order of the Bath
Knights of the Order of the Crescent
Military personnel from Norfolk
People educated at Norwich School
People educated at Paston College
People from Norfolk
People from King's Lynn and West Norfolk (district)
Royal Navy vice admirals
Royalty and nobility with disabilities
Peers of Great Britain created by George III
Viscounts in the Peerage of the United Kingdom
People who died at sea
Royal Navy personnel of the American Revolutionary War